Niambia  is a  commune in the Cercle of Bafoulabé in the Kayes Region of south-western Mali. The main village (chef-lieu) is Horokoto. In the 2009 census the commune had a population of 7,712.

Population history

References

External links
 Niambia at csa-mali.org

Communes of Kayes Region